Tomáš Janků (born 27 December 1974 in Jablonec nad Nisou) is a former Czech high jumper.

His personal best jump is 2.34 metres, achieved at the 2006 European Championships in Gothenburg. In 2010, he married Czech pole vaulter Kateřina Baďurová. His older brother Jan Janků was also a prominent high jumper.

Achievements

References
 

1974 births
Living people
Sportspeople from Jablonec nad Nisou
Czech male high jumpers
Athletes (track and field) at the 1996 Summer Olympics
Athletes (track and field) at the 2004 Summer Olympics
Athletes (track and field) at the 2008 Summer Olympics
Olympic athletes of the Czech Republic
European Athletics Championships medalists